Timeless is a BBC Books original novel written by Stephen Cole and based on the long-running British science fiction television series Doctor Who. It features the Eighth Doctor, Fitz, Anji and Trix.

Plot
The Doctor takes a huge risk to restore the collapsing multiverse.

External links
The Cloister Library - Timeless

2003 British novels
2003 science fiction novels
Eighth Doctor Adventures
Novels by Stephen Cole